Male egg can refer to either:
An egg that artificially contains genetic material from a male.

An egg from a haplodiploid species such as an ant or bee that is unfertilized and will hatch a male
A fertilized egg that a male organism is developing in
This article focuses on the first definition.

Male eggs are the result of a process in which the eggs of a female would be emptied of their genetic contents (a technique similar to that used in the cloning process), and those contents would be replaced with male DNA. Such eggs could then be fertilized by sperm.  The procedure was conceived by Calum MacKellar, a Scottish bioethicist. With this technique, two males could be the biological parents of a child. However, such a procedure would additionally require an artificial womb or a female gestational carrier.

See also
 Female sperm
 Male pregnancy
 LGBT reproduction

References

Applied genetics
Biological engineering
Biotechnology
Genetic engineering
Medical ethics

Sexuality